John Holdeman (January 31, 1832 - March 10, 1900) was a self-described prophet and the American founder of the Church of God in Christ, Mennonite, also known as the Holdeman Mennonite Church. This is a plain dress and theologically conservative Mennonite denomination that has 26,000 members, mostly in the United States and Canada.

John was born in Wayne County, Ohio in 1832 to Amos and Nacy (Yoder) Holdeman. He began preaching in 1858, and he drew a large following in Kansas. He preached across the United States and Canada throughout his lifetime. In 1881 he convinced many members of another Mennonite denomination, the Kleine Gemeinde, which had originated in the Russian Empire, to join his "true church". Holdeman died in 1900 at the age of 68.

References

1832 births
1900 deaths
People from Wayne County, Ohio
American Mennonites
19th-century Anabaptist ministers
Place of death missing
Christians from Ohio
Mennonite theologians
19th-century American clergy